The blue-whiskered tanager (Tangara johannae) is a species of bird in the family Thraupidae.
It is found in the Chocó of Colombia and Ecuador.
Its natural habitat is subtropical or tropical moist lowland forests.
It is threatened by habitat loss.

References

blue-whiskered tanager
Birds of the Tumbes-Chocó-Magdalena
blue-whiskered tanager
Taxonomy articles created by Polbot